Max's Kansas City was a nightclub and restaurant at 213 Park Avenue South in New York City, which became a gathering spot for musicians, poets, artists and politicians in the 1960s and 1970s. It was opened by Mickey Ruskin (1933–1983) in December 1965 and closed in 1981.

History

Max's I
Max's quickly became a hangout of choice for artists and sculptors of the New York School, like John Chamberlain, Robert Rauschenberg and Larry Rivers, whose presence attracted hip celebrities and the jet set. Neil Williams, Larry Zox, Forrest (Frosty) Myers, Larry Poons, Brice Marden, Bob Neuwirth, Dan Christensen, Ronnie Landfield, Ching Ho Cheng, Richard Bernstein, Peter Reginato, Carl Andre, Dan Graham, Lawrence Weiner, Robert Smithson, Joseph Kosuth, Brigid Berlin, Viva, Edie Sedgwick, David R. Prentice, Roy Lichtenstein, Peter Forakis, Peter Young, Mark di Suvero, Larry Bell, Donald Judd, Dan Flavin, Richard Serra, Lee Lozano, Carlos Villa, Jack Whitten, Edward Leffingwell, Philip Glass, Max Neuhaus, Ray Johnson, Malcolm Morley, Lotti Golden, Marjorie Strider, Edward Avedisian, Carolee Schneemann, Dorothea Rockburne, Norman Bluhm, Kenneth Showell, Robert Tex Wray, John Griefen, Colette Justine, Lenore Jaffee, Tally Brown, Taylor Mead, William S. Burroughs, Allen Ginsberg, René Ricard, Richard Gallo, Stephen Shore, Marta Minujín, and Marisol were just some of the artists seen regularly at Max's. Willem de Kooning, Barnett Newman, Henry Geldzahler, art critics Lucy Lippard, Robert Hughes, Clement Greenberg, and Harold Rosenberg, art dealers Leo Castelli, and David Whitney, whose gallery was across the street, writers Lillian Roxon, Fran Lebowitz, Germaine Greer, and architect Philip Johnson occasionally would be seen there as well.

It was also a favorite hangout of Andy Warhol and his entourage, who dominated the back room. The Velvet Underground played there regularly, including their last shows with Lou Reed before he quit the band, in the summer of 1970. It was a home base for the glam rock scene, which included Marc Bolan, David Bowie, Iggy Pop, Lou Reed, Alice Cooper, the New York Dolls, Wayne County, Dorian Zero and the Magic Tramps. While her band did not play there until the second incarnation of the club, Patti Smith and her boyfriend, artist Robert Mapplethorpe, visited Max's almost nightly from 1969 through the early 1970s, before it began booking punk rock bands. Smith and guitarist Lenny Kaye also performed there as a duo on New Year's Day 1974, opening for Phil Ochs. Many bands made early appearances there. Bruce Springsteen played a solo acoustic set in the summer of 1972. He also played sets at the club on November 6, 7 and 8, 1973. It was the site of Aerosmith's first New York City gig. Columbia Records president Clive Davis later signed Aerosmith to his record label there. Bob Marley & the Wailers opened for Bruce Springsteen at Max's, commencing Marley's career on the international circuit. Iggy and the Stooges performed a string of shows in July/August 1973. Big Star performed two shows in December 1973. Tim Buckley, Tom Waits, Bonnie Raitt, Odetta, Eddie Mottau,  Dave Van Ronk, John Herald, Garland Jeffreys, Sylvia Tyson, Emmylou Harris, Gram Parsons, Elliott Murphy and Country Joe McDonald were some of the musicians that also played there. Fashion designer Carlos Falchi was a busboy, as was artist, publisher and filmmaker Anton Perich; Deborah Harry was a waitress there.

By the end of 1974, Max's had lost popularity among the art crowd and the glam era was in decline. The legendary establishment closed in December of that year. Ed Koch later had a campaign office in the building. In 2015 photographer Marcia Resnick documented the people at Max's in her book Punks, Poets, and Provocateurs – New York City Bad Boys – 1977–1982.

Mickey Ruskin
Shortly after graduating from Cornell Law School, Mickey Ruskin opened The Tenth Street Coffeehouse, which featured nightly poetry readings. He then opened Les Deux Megots on East Ninth Street. His next endeavor was a bar called the Ninth Circle Steak House, a hangout for artists and musicians on West 10th Street. After opening Max's Kansas City, he opened similar restaurants including: the Longview Country Club (later known as Levine's Restaurant) which was on 19th Street and Park Avenue South, diagonally across the street from Max's and Max's Terre Haute, on the Upper East Side, but they did not do as well. His next club was The Locale on Waverly Place that he opened with partner Richard Sanders. Sanders kept The Locale and Mickey went on to The Lower Manhattan Ocean Club, on Chambers Street in TriBeCa. Ruskin's last enterprise was Chinese Chance (nicknamed One U), a bar and restaurant that he opened with partner Sanders, located at 1 University Place in Greenwich Village. The French composer Duncan Youngerman and the poet and mail artist Adam Czarnowski both worked there as busboys. Lauren Hutton, Ellen Barkin, Gerard Malanga, Joe Jackson, Joni Mitchell, Nico, David Bowie and a score of other Lower Manhattan celebs hung out there, as well as the artists that formerly frequented Max's and the doormen of the Mudd Club. Ruskin died in New York City on May 16, 1983, at the age of 50.

Max's II
Max's Kansas City reopened in 1975 under the ownership of Tommy Dean Mills, who initially thought he would make it a disco. Peter Crowley, who had been booking the same early punk bands that played at CBGB and Mothers, a gay bar on West 23rd Street, was hired to book bands at Max's.

Under Crowley's guidance the club became one of the birthplaces of punk, regularly featuring bands including Cherry Vanilla, Wayne County & the Electric Chairs, Ruby and the Rednecks, The Offs, The Fast, Suicide (who all appeared on the compilation album "1976 Max's Kansas City"), the New York Dolls, Patti Smith Group, the Ramones, the Mumps, the Heartbreakers, Television, Blondie, Talking Heads, Sniper, the Dictators, the Cramps, Mink DeVille, Misfits, Little Annie, the Fleshtones, the B-52's, the Stimulators, the Bongos and Klaus Nomi, as well as out-of-town bands such as the Runaways and the Damned. After the breakup of the Sex Pistols, Sid Vicious played all of his US solo gigs there. Devo played several shows at Max's in 1977, including a show where they were introduced by David Bowie as "the band of the future."
Max's Kansas City is mentioned in the Sex Pistols´song "New York" from Never Mind The Bollocks album, 1976.
Max's original site closed in November 1981. Bad Brains were the headliners on the final night, with the Beastie Boys opening. The building survives and now houses a Korean deli.

Max's III
Mills reopened the club again on January 27, 1998, at a new location—240 West 52nd Street—site of the former Lone Star Roadhouse. However, it closed shortly after opening.

The opening had been delayed due to litigation by Ruskin's widow, Yvonne Sewall-Ruskin, who claimed that she owned the trademark to Max's Kansas City and was granted a temporary restraining order to prevent use of the name.

Aftermath
In 2000, Acidwork Productions, Inc., a production company founded by Neil Holstein (second cousin of Mickey Ruskin) began working in conjunction with Victoria Ruskin (Mickey Ruskin's daughter) on a feature-length documentary about Mickey Ruskin and his many establishments, including Max's Kansas City.

In 2001, Yvonne Sewall-Ruskin established the Max's Kansas City Project, in memory of her late husband. In the spirit of Ruskin's philosophy of helping artists in need, the project, a 501(c)(3) non-profit providing emergency funding and resources for individuals in the arts in crisis. The nonprofit is also dedicated to empowering teens through the arts.

Yvonne was also planning to produce a documentary on the history of Max's Kansas City following an oral history on Max's, "High on Rebellion", that was published in 1998 by Thunder's Mouth Press and is presently an ebook through Open Road Digital Media.

References

Sources

Further reading
Weinberger, Tony, The Max's Kansas City stories (1971) Bobbs-Merrill [1971] Call number in Library of Congress: PS3573.E393 M3
Kasher, Steven, Max's Kansas City: Art, Glamour, Rock and Roll (2010) Abrams Image, .

External links

www.maxskansascity.org Max's Kansas City Project

Nightclubs in Manhattan
Former music venues in New York City
Punk rock venues
Music venues in Manhattan
1965 establishments in New York City
1981 disestablishments in New York (state)
Music venues completed in 1965
Union Square, Manhattan